Sarband District or Nohiya-i Sarband is a former district in Khatlon Region, Tajikistan. Its capital was Levakant (former name: Sarband). Around 2018, it was merged into the city of Levakant.

Administrative divisions
The district was divided administratively into jamoats. They were as follows (and population).

References

Districts of Khatlon Region
Former districts of Tajikistan